The BRP Rajah Humabon (PS-11) was a former destroyer escort of the United States Navy and a former frigate of the Philippine Navy. She was the last World War II-era destroyer escort/frigate active in her fleet, and one of the oldest active warships in the world, until 15 March 2018 when she was formally decommissioned after 75 years. She was one of three ex-USN s that served the Philippine Navy, the others being BRP Datu Sikatuna (PF-5/PS-77) and BRP Datu Kalantiaw (PS-76).

History

United States Navy

She served in the Pacific theatre in the middle of 1945 until she was decommissioned and placed in reserve on 10 December 1945. For her service during World War II, she was awarded with one battle star.

Japan Maritime Self-Defense Force

She was transferred to the Japanese government as JDS Hatsuhi (DE-263) on 14 June 1955. Together with her sistership JDS Asahi (DE-262), they became one of the first warships of the newly organized Japan Maritime Self-Defense Force. As newer ships became available to the JMSDF, both ships were decommissioned and returned to the US Navy in June 1975.

Philippine Navy

Remained laid-up in Japan, she was transferred to the Philippine government on 13 September 1976 and was Transferred as an Excess Defense Article on 23 December 1978. As a Philippine Navy ship, she was named RPS Rajah Humabon (PS-78), and was towed to South Korea for an extensive refit and modernization in 1979. During this period South Korea also turned over 2 of their own ex-USN Cannon class ships to the US Navy in 1977, namely the Kyong Ki (DE-71) /  and Kang Won (DE-72) / . These were also turned-over by the US to the Philippine government, which were later on cannibalized for use as parts hulk to upgrade and repair the Rajah Humabon and her sistership Datu Sikatuna.

With these upgrades, she was formally commissioned to the Philippine Navy on 27 February 1980, and formed the backbone of the Philippine Fleet together with 2 of her sister ships and other ex-US Navy destroyer escorts. She was renamed and reclassified as BRP Rajah Humabon (PF-6) effective 23 June 1980, now using the "BRP" ship prefix in lieu of "RPS" and following a new standard classifying it as a "Frigate", and served until 1993 when she was retired. But due to pressing needs, she was later called back into service in 1995 after being overhauled at the Cavite Naval Dockyard by Hatch & Kirk Inc., and was formally recommissioned in January 1996 as BRP Rajah Humabon (PF-11) with a new hull number.

Another minor refit between 1995 and 1996 saw changes in the ship's weapons, sensors and engine systems. Her anti-submarine weapons and equipment were removed due to lack of spare parts. The removed equipment includes the EDO SQS-17B hull-mounted sonar, a Mk.9 depth charge rack, six Mk.6 depth charge projects aft and a Hedgehog Mk.10 anti-submarine projectors forward, as well as Mk.38 anti-submarine torpedoes in two triple tube amidships. The loss of these items totally removed her anti-submarine warfare capabilities, which was outdated by modern standards. But it was reported in 2005 that her fore Hedgehog ASW is still operational, together with her 8 K-gun Mk6 depth charge projectors and SQS-17B sonar, although recent photos do not show the depth charge projectors on its usual location.

She had been experiencing hull problems, but was repaired with the assistance of the crew of the US Navy's ship USS Salvor during CARAT 2002 dive training operations held in Manila Bay.

Additional electronic upgrades were made, including the installation of a Furuno Satellite Communication system and a mast-mounted FLIR package.

The ship's code designation was changed based on a new classification, name, number and categorization of PN ships, crafts, aircraft, and ground equipage dated April 2016. Based on this change, the ship's designation was changed from PF-11 to PS-11.

As of May 2010 she was part of the Philippine Navy contingent for the RP-US Balikatan 2010 exercises, and continued to operate from the Philippine Navy's main naval base in Cavite and visits the Navy Headquarters in Manila. She was assigned to the Patrol Force of the Philippine Fleet.

She then operated as a ceremonial ship to welcome foreign ships docking in Manila Bay. She was decommissioned on March 15, 2018 and was planned to be part of the Philippine Navy museum in Sangley Point. However, on October 30, 2022 she capsized and sank in a storm while moored at Cavite.

Technical details

Armaments
Although fairly well-armed, most of her weapon systems are manually operated and are of World War II origin.

The guns were directed by a Mk.52 gun fire control system with a Mk.41 rangefinder, but this appears to be non-operational.

She also carries a total of three twin Mk.1 Bofors L/60 40 mm anti-aircraft guns directed individually by Mk.51 gun fire control system, six Mk.4 20 mm Oerlikon cannons, and four M2 Browning 50 caliber machine guns.

All anti-submarine weapons were removed as of 1996.

Machinery
The ship is powered by two EMD 16-645E7 turbo-blown diesel engines with a combined power of around  driving two propellers. It replaced the original four EMD 16-278A diesel engines during the ship's overhaul in 1996.

Electronics
The ship is equipped with a Raytheon AN/SPS-64(V)11 short range surface search and navigation radar and a Furuno navigation radar, replacing the SPS-5 surface search radar and the RCA/GE Mk.26 navigation radar. Previously equipped with an EDO AN/SQS-17B hull-mounted sonar, it is said to be deleted in 1996 due to lack of spare parts and obsolescence although it was reported to be still present in 2004.

Notable operations

Deployments
On 17 June 2011 the Rajah Humabon was sent for patrols around the Scarborough Shoal after China announced that its biggest maritime patrol vessel, the Haixun 31, will be sent to the area on its way to Singapore.

International
On 2 February 2000, the Rajah Humabon fired warning shots at two Chinese fishing boats near Scarborough Shoal. According to Navy chief Vice Admiral Luisito Fernandez, the Rajah Humabon was forced to fire warning shots to avert a collision with two Chinese fishing boats and only after the Chinese boats refused to respond to radio contact, loudspeaker, sirens, and flashing lights.

On 22 June 2002, Rajah Humabon together with BRP Rizal visited Shanghai, China for a goodwill visit.

Exercises

Again Rajah Humabon, together with BRP Dagupan City (LC-551), and BRP Apolinario Mabini (PS-36), USS Essex (LHD-2), and USS Denver (LPD-9) were part of the naval phase of the US-RP Balikatan 2010 (BK10) bi-lateral exercises held in March 2010.

On 14 to 16 August 2012, the Naval Forces Northern Luzon (NFNL) conducted a small-scale Naval Exercise code-named SAGEX 02-12 at the waters of South China Sea. BRP Rajah Humabon together with BRP Gregorio del Pilar and BRP Liberato Picar participated under Naval Task Force (NTF) 11. The exercise includes patrol, simulated tracking of targets and interdiction and capped by live firing exercises.

Rajah Humabon, together with BRP Gregorio del Pilar participated in the sea phase exercises with the US Navy during the Balikatan 2013 from 5 to 17 April 2013.

In popular culture
BRP Rajah Humabon was among the Philippine Navy ships who battled invading People's Liberation Army - Navy ships in Dale Brown's 1991 novel Sky Masters. In this novel, she was classified as a PF class frigate, and was equipped with a four-shot Mk141 Harpoon missile launcher.

Gallery

See also
 List of ships of the Philippine Navy

References

Notes

External links
Philippine Navy Official website
Philippine Defense Forum
NavSource Online: Destroyer Escort Photo Archive
Hazegray World Navies Today: Philippines
USS Atherton DE-169 Official Website
Naming and Code Designation of PN Ships

Datu Kalantiaw-class frigates
Ships built in Kearny, New Jersey
1943 ships
Frigates of the Philippines